Joe De La Cruz may refer to:
 Joe DeLaCruz, Native American leader in Washington, U.S.
 Joe De La Cruz (actor), Mexican-American character actor